Choe Kum-hui (born July 1, 1987) is a North Korean platform diver. She won two bronze medals for the women's synchronized platform at the 2006 Asian Games in Doha, Qatar, and at the 2010 Asian Games in Guangzhou, China. Choe also captured three silver medals in the same event at the Summer Universiade (2005 in Izmir, Turkey, 2007 in Bangkok, Thailand, and 2005 in Belgrade, Serbia).

Choe represented North Korea at the 2008 Summer Olympics in Beijing, where she competed for the women's 10 m synchronized platform event. She and her partner Kim Un-hyang finished sixth in the final round by one point behind the U.S. team (Mary Beth Dunnichay and Haley Ishimatsu), with a total score of 308.10 after five successive attempts.

References

External links
NBC Olympics Profile

North Korean female divers
Living people
Olympic divers of North Korea
Divers at the 2008 Summer Olympics
Asian Games medalists in diving
1987 births
Divers at the 2006 Asian Games
Divers at the 2010 Asian Games
Asian Games bronze medalists for North Korea
Medalists at the 2006 Asian Games
Medalists at the 2010 Asian Games
Universiade medalists in diving
Universiade silver medalists for North Korea
Medalists at the 2005 Summer Universiade
Medalists at the 2007 Summer Universiade
Medalists at the 2009 Summer Universiade
21st-century North Korean women